Lilit Soghomonyan (born on February 18, 1969, in Yerevan) is an Armenian artist.

Biography 
Lilit Soghomonyan was born in 1969 in Yerevan in the artistic family of Van Soghomonyan and Nona Gabrielyan. She studied at Fine Arts and Drama Institute, Yerevan, Armenia (1985-1991). Since 1992 Lilit Soghomonyan is a member of Artists' Union of Armenia.

Exhibitions
 2014 St. John Armenian Church, San Francisco, United States
 2012 Modern Art Museum of Yerevan
 2008 Cultural Center “Pokrovskie vorota”, Moscow,  Russia
 2004 Gevorgyan Gallery, Yerevan, Armenia
 2000 Artists’ Museum, Washington DC, USA
 1992 Gallery  Kreishaus, Hofheim, Germany

Group exhibitions 
Lilit Soghomonyan started to participate in group exhibions since 1989 in Russia, Germany, UAE, Switzerland, USA, Georgia, Syria, Italy, Armenia, Lebanon, Belarus, France.

Collections
Lilit Soghomonyan's artworks can be found at National Gallery of Armenia, Modern Art Museum of Yerevan.

Family
 Father - Van Soghomonyan, artist
 Mother - Nona Gabrielyan, artist, sculptor
 Husband - Gagik Ghazanchyan, painter
 Son - Guy Ghazanchyan, painter, sculptor

Gallery
Paintings

References

External links
 Official web page (Archived)

1969 births
Living people
Artists from Yerevan
20th-century Armenian women artists
21st-century Armenian women artists
Armenian painters
Armenian women painters
20th-century painters
21st-century painters